Julie Pinel (fl. 1710–1737) was a French composer and harpsichord teacher, born into the Pinel family of court musicians. Very little is known of her life, but she dedicated her published collection of songs to the "Prince of Soubize", thought to be Charles de Rohan, the patron of her family.

Works

Nouveau recueil d'airs sérieux et à boire
Pinel published her collection of 31 songs, Nouveau receuil d'airs sérioux et à boire in 1737. Selected works include:
Le Printems, cantatille
Rossignols
Boccages
Echos indiscrets
Bergères
Pourquoy
Appollonius, opera

Her music has been recorded and issued on CD, including:
The Pleasures of Love and Libation Orchestra: La Donna Musicale, Conductor: Laury Gutierrez, Audio CD (May 1, 2007), Label: La, ASIN: B003050FXY

References

1710 births
1737 deaths
French Baroque composers
French women classical composers
French music educators
18th-century classical composers
18th-century French composers
Women music educators
18th-century women composers